Derchinger Baggersee is a lake in Swabia, Bavaria, Germany. At an elevation of 464 m, its surface area is 6 ha.

References 

Lakes of Bavaria
Aichach-Friedberg